The 2007 LA Galaxy season was the 12th season of the team's existence, and their 12th in Major League Soccer, the top flight of American soccer. The season was highlighted by the first season of David Beckham's career in MLS with the Galaxy. Outside of MLS the Galaxy played in the U.S. Open Cup, where they reached the third round, and the inaugural edition of the North American SuperLiga, CONCACAF's former secondary club tournament. In the Open Cup, the Galaxy reached the third round, while in the SuperLiga, the Galaxy finished as runners-up. Their 5th place record in the West was not good enough for the Galaxy to earn a berth into the MLS Cup playoffs, making it the second-consecutive year the Galaxy did not qualify for the playoffs.

Along with Beckham's mid-season arrival, the team changed its image and released new home and away kits along with a new team logo. Before his arrival, Galaxy used their previous season's white away as their home kit, and the yellow home as the away kits. In an effort to keep up with the rest of the world's soccer marketing tactics, MLS allowed for clubs to have shirt sponsors on the front, and since then, local brand Herbalife became the Galaxy's main shirt sponsor.

Club

Non-competitive

Preseason friendlies

Midseason friendlies

Postseason friendlies

Competitive

Major League Soccer

U.S. Open Cup

SuperLiga

Group stage

Knockout round

Statistics

Transfers

In

Out

Loan in

Loan out

Draft picks

References 

LA Galaxy seasons
Los Angeles Galaxy
Los Angeles Galaxy
2007 in sports in California